Sezar Akgul, aka Sezer Akgül, (born on 27 April 1988 in Amasya) is a freestyle wrestler from Turkey.

He won a bronze medal at the 2007 European Wrestling Championships held in Sofia, Bulgaria and again at the 
2008 European Wrestling Championships in Tampere, Finland. He also won silver medal at the 2009 FILA Wrestling World Championships.

Sezar Akgül participated in Men's freestyle 55 kg at 2008 Summer Olympics. In 1/8 of final, he lost to Japanese Tomohiro Matsunaga. In the repechage round after beating Adama Diatta from Senegal, he was eliminated by Dilshod Mansurov (Uzbekistan).

He won the gold medal in the freestyle 55 kg event at the 2009 Mediterranean Games held in Pescara, Italy.

In 2013, he repeated his European bronze medal title at the championships held in Tbilisi, Georgia. at the 2013 World Wrestling Championships in Budapest, Hungary, he won the bronze medal.

In June 2015, he competed in the inaugural European Games, for Turkey in wrestling, more specifically, Men's freestyle in the 57 kilogram range. He earned a bronze medal.

References

External links
 

Living people
1988 births
Olympic wrestlers of Turkey
Turkish male sport wrestlers
Wrestlers at the 2008 Summer Olympics
People from Amasya
European Games medalists in wrestling
Wrestlers at the 2015 European Games
European Games bronze medalists for Turkey
World Wrestling Championships medalists

Mediterranean Games gold medalists for Turkey
Competitors at the 2009 Mediterranean Games
Mediterranean Games medalists in wrestling
European Wrestling Championships medalists
21st-century Turkish people